Baital is a village in the Joypur CD block in the Bishnupur subdivision of the Bankura district in the state of West Bengal, India. It is a part of Dakshinbar village.

Geography

Location

Note: The map alongside presents some of the notable locations in the subdivision. All places marked in the map are linked in the larger full screen map.

Demographics
According to the 2011 Census of India, Dakshinbar had a total population of 4,031, of which 2,070 (51%) were males and 1,961 (49%) were females. There were 408 persons in the age range of 0–6 years. The total number of literate persons in Dakshinbar was 2,754 (76.01% of the population over 6 years).

Education
Baital G.P. Vidyapith is a Bengali-medium coeducational institution established in 1926. It has facilities for teaching from class V to class XII. The school has 11 computers, a library with 1,100 books and a playground.

Baital Girls’ High School is a Bengali-medium girls only institution established in 2011. It has facilities for teaching from class V to class X.

Chatra Ramai Pandit Mahavidyalaya, was established at Chatra, PO Darapur in 2000.

Culture
David J. McCutchion speaks of 2 temples at Baital. One is the Shyama Chandi temple, a pancha ratna with rigged rekha turrets and porch on triple archway, with 35 ft 4 in square base, a laterite plain structure built in 1660. The other is the Jhagrai Chandi temple, a smooth curvilinear rekha, with 11’ 2” square base, a laterite, largely plain structure, built in 1659.

Baital picture gallery

Healthcare
Joypur Block Primary Health Centre, with 15 beds at Joypur, is the major government medical facility in the Joypur CD block.

References

External links

Villages in Bankura district